Escallonia angustifolia is an evergreen shrub or treelet in the Escalloniaceae family, native to Argentina, Chile and southern Peru.

References

angustifolia
Trees of Argentina
Trees of Chile
Trees of Peru